63 is a four-story shopping mall under construction on the Las Vegas Strip in Paradise, Nevada. It will be part of the CityCenter complex, owned by MGM Resorts International. The two-acre site was previously planned as The Harmon, a hotel within CityCenter. However, due to structural defects, the hotel never opened and was dismantled in 2015. The property was sold six years later to developer Brett Torino and partner Flag Luxury Group, with plans to build retail space on the site. Construction of 63 began in June 2021, and the project is scheduled to open in 2023.

History
63 will be part of the CityCenter complex, occupying a two-acre site at the southwestern corner of Las Vegas Boulevard and Harmon Avenue. The land was previously intended for The Harmon, an unfinished CityCenter hotel that was dismantled in 2015, due to structural defects. In April 2021, MGM Resorts International and its CityCenter partner, Dubai World, agreed to sell the land to Las Vegas developer Brett Torino and New York-based Flag Luxury Group. They planned to build a four-story shopping mall known as "Project 63", named for how old Torino and Flag CEO Paul Kanavos were at the time. The project name was later shortened to "63".

The project was designed in collaboration with MGM to ensure that it complements the existing CityCenter complex. MGM sold the land on the condition that a high-rise not be built on the property.  The company approved of 63's four-story height, which would have minimal effect on the views from CityCenter's hotels.

The $80 million sale was finalized in June 2021, and construction began that month, with Penta Building Group as general contractor. Site preparation work took around six months, and included testing of pilings and footings left over following the Harmon's dismantling. 63 was topped off on April 26, 2022, one year after the land sale was announced. Much of the facility was completed in October 2022, with the remainder expected to be finished four months later. Tenants are expected to open in 2023.

Features
It is located directly north of CityCenter's high-end shopping mall, The Shops at Crystals, with which it will not compete.

Ocean Prime will open a $20 million steakhouse on the top floor. At , it will be the brand's largest restaurant and its flagship location. It will also be the first Ocean Prime to open in Las Vegas, and will serve as the anchor restaurant for Project 63. The restaurant is scheduled to open in 2023. Museum of Illusions, a chain of magic museums, is also scheduled to open a location at 63 during 2023.

References

External links
 Official website

Buildings and structures in Paradise, Nevada
Shopping malls in the Las Vegas Valley
Las Vegas Strip
Proposed buildings and structures in Nevada
Buildings and structures under construction in the United States